The year 1991 in science and technology involved many significant events, some listed below.

Astronomy and space exploration
 May 18 – Helen Sharman becomes the first British person in space, flying with the Soyuz TM-12 mission.
 October 29 – The Galileo probe becomes the first spacecraft to visit an asteroid (951 Gaspra).
 Steven Balbus and John F. Hawley publish their insights on magnetorotational instability.
 Asteroid 6859 Datemasamune is discovered by Masahiro Koishikawa.
 Asteroid 11514 Tsunenaga is discovered by Masahiro Koishikawa.
 There are four lunar eclipses: three penumbral on January 30, July 26, and June 27, and one minor partial lunar eclipse on December 21.
 There are two solar eclipses: one annular eclipse on January 15, and a very long total eclipse on July 11 (lasting 6 minutes and 53 seconds).

Chemistry
 Carbon nanotubes discovered in the insoluble material of arc-burned graphite rods by Sumio Iijima of NEC.

Computer science
 February 26 – Tim Berners-Lee introduces WorldWideWeb (the first web browser), and a WYSIWYG HTML editor.
 May 14 – Nicola Pellow, an intern working under the direction of Berners-Lee, introduces Line Mode Browser, the first cross-platform web browser.
 June 5 – Phil Zimmermann posts the first Pretty Good Privacy (PGP) data encryption program.
 June 23 – The video game Sonic the Hedgehog is first released, propelling the Sega Genesis 16-bit console into mass popularity.
 August 6 – The first website goes online at CERN.
 The Trojan Room coffee pot at the Computer Laboratory, University of Cambridge, England, inspires the first webcam.
 October - Apple releases the PowerBook laptop computer.

Conservation
 October 1 – The New Zealand Resource Management Act 1991 comes into effect.

Geophysics
 Alan Hildebrand and others provide support for the Alvarez hypothesis for the Cretaceous–Paleogene extinction event by proposing the Chicxulub crater in the Yucatán Peninsula of Mexico as the impact site for a large asteroid 66 million years ago.
 The Ames crater impact structure is identified in Major County, Oklahoma.

Mathematics
 July – English physicist Philip Candelas and colleagues show that mirror symmetry could be used to solve problems in enumerative geometry.
 Qiudong Wang produces a global solution to the n-body problem.

Physics
 January 1 – Finland joins CERN.
 July 1 – Poland joins CERN.

Physiology and medicine
 Takotsubo cardiomyopathy first studied.

Technology
 July 1 – World's first GSM telephone call made in Finland.

Publications
 The first open-access scientific online archive, arXiv, is begun as a preprint service for physicists, initiated by Paul Ginsparg.

Awards
 Nobel Prizes
 Physics – Pierre-Gilles de Gennes
 Chemistry – Richard R. Ernst
 Medicine – Erwin Neher, Bert Sakmann
 Turing Award – Robin Milner

Births
 February 28 – Sheree Atcheson, Sri Lankan-Irish computer scientist

Deaths
 January 30 – John Bardeen (b. 1908), American physicist, co-inventor of the transistor and twice winner of the Nobel Prize in Physics.
 February 6 – Salvador Luria (b. 1912), Italian-born biologist, co-winner of the Nobel Prize in Physiology or Medicine.
 February 23 – Sir Charles Illingworth (b. 1899), British surgeon.
 March 1 – Edwin H. Land (b. 1909), American inventor of the Land Camera.
 June 2 – Mary Loveless (b. 1899), American immunologist.
 June 5 – Min Chueh Chang (b. 1908), Chinese American embryologist.
 July 4 – Victor Chang (b. 1936), Australian cardiac surgeon, murdered.
 December 2 – Anne Beloff-Chain (b. 1921), British biochemist.

References

 
20th century in science
1990s in science